Mirpuri may refer to:
something of, from, or related to any of the places known as Mirpur
more specifically, something of, from or related to the region of Mirpur, Pakistan
Mirpuri dialect, a variety of Pahari-Pothwari spoken in the region
 Mahan Singh Mirpuri (d. 1844), general in the kingdom of Maharaja Ranjit Singh
 Mirpuri Group, which runs Hi Fly (airline) in Portugal

See also
British Mirpuri community

Language and nationality disambiguation pages